Bartholomew Green is a hamlet in the Felsted civil parish and the Uttlesford district of Essex, England. The nearest town is Braintree.

References 
A-Z Essex, 2010 edition. p. 24.

Hamlets in Essex
Felsted